Associazione Sportiva Dilettantisica S.S. Leonzio 1909, also commonly known as Leonzio, is an Italian football club located in Lentini.

They participate in the 2022–23 Eccellenza, the fifth level of the Italian football league system.

History

Origins (1909–1980s)

The club was founded in 1909 as Sport Club Leonzio by some students attending the Technical and Commercial Institute of Augusta. Among them, Giuseppe Messina, Angelino Nobile and Francesco Siracusano were from Lentini. They chose black and white as the club's colours. In 1914, the marchioness Riso organised a four-team competition that saw the participation of US Catanese, Megara Augusta, Leonzio, and Carlentini. The award consisted of a diploma and a gold medal. Leonzio reached the final, in which they had to face Carlentini in an away match in the nearby town in what was the first derby of Leonzio's history. However, the first match was suspended because a brawl erupted. The organizers decided to replay the game in the neutral venue of Agnone Bagni. Leonzio eventually won the competition, managing to attract the first interest of Lentinesi towards football.

After having participated in regional and juvenile tournaments for decades, Leonzio was admitted to the 1945–46 Serie C. At the end of the season, economic troubles, which have characterized the club throughout its history, prevented Leonzio from renewing the registration to the league. After 10 additional years spent in minor regional championships, the club was admitted through a repechage to 1956–57 Promozione Sicilia, the higher tier of regional tournaments in Sicily. The permanence in this league lasted for three seasons, as Leonzio was relegated to Prima Categoria during the 1959–60 season. Leonzio had to wait until the 1968–69 season to be promoted back on the fourth tier of the Italian football league system, conquering the 1969–70 Serie D under the management of Adelmo Prenna, who was also a playing footballer of the team.

Starting from the 1969–70 season, Leonzio competed for ten consecutive seasons in Serie D, achieving a second place as the best result in the 1972–73 Serie D.

Atletico Leonzio era (1988–1994)
One of the most prominent eras of the Lentinese club started in 1988, when Società Sportiva Atletico Leonzio was formed after the fusion between Società Sportiva Leonzio (which would have been relegated to the Seconda Categoria Sicilia for the 1988–89 season) and Società Sportiva Atletico Catania. This new society joined the 1988–89 Serie C2. In the fifth consecutive season in Serie C2, Atletico Leonzio achieved second place in Girone C, being promoted to 1993–94 Serie C1. However, the chairman Franco Proto decided to move the club to Catania at the end of the season. The fusion with Atletico Catania was, therefore, disrupted. The old club was reformed by the name of Società Sportiva Leonzio 1909, which enrolled the 1994–95 Campionato Nazionale Dilettanti.

Refoundations and return to regional leagues (1995–2013)
At the end of the season, S.S. Leonzio 1909 were relegated to the 1995–96 Eccellenza Sicily, in which they will remain for six seasons before being relegated again to Promozione at the end of the season 2000–01. In the summer of 2002, the title of the freshly promoted to Serie D Misterbanco was moved to Lentini under the nomination of Associazione Calcio Lentini, This new team participated in the 2002–03 Serie D, but at the end of the season it was relegated to Eccellenza after losing relegation playoffs to Nuova Vibonese. In the meanwhile, S.S. Leonzio 1909 had participated in 2002–03 Promozione, being relegated to 2003–04 Prima Categoria at the end of the season.

A new denomination, Associazione Calcio Sporting Leonzio 1909, was given to A.C. Lentini in the 2003 summer. A.C.S. Leonzio 1909 enrolled in the 2003–04 Serie D. Even though the relegation was barely avoided by winning the relegation playoffs, the endless financial problems of the club forced them to join the 2004–05 Eccellenza instead with the name Associazione Calcio Leonzio 1909. By the 2009–10 season, Leonzio, which in the meanwhile had taken the name Associazione Sportiva Dilettantistica Leonzio, sank to Prima Categoria. In this season, they reached but lost promotion playoffs against Real San Cristoforo because of a tough 0–5 at home. However, Leonzio was admitted to  the 2010–11 Promozione through a repechage.

On April 2, 2011, Leonzio was promoted to Eccellenza by winning 1–0 against Comiso. Leonzio ended the 2011–12 Eccellenza at the fifteenth place with only 6 points. In August 2012, Leonzio remained without a chairman and did not enrol in any league. As a consequence, Associazione Sportiva Dilettantistica Atletico Leonzio restarted from Terza Categoria, the bottom of the Italian league system.

Sicula Leonzio era and return to Serie C (2013–2017)

On July 1, 2013, a new club, named Associazione Sportiva Dilettantistica Sicula Leonzio and formed from the title of Real Belpassese, was admitted to Promozione. Sicula Leonzio achieved third place at the end of the season, but they lost the promotion playoffs against Comprensorio Normanno, missing the promotion to Eccellenza. However, Sicula Leonzio achieved two promotions in a row in the following two seasons. During the 2014–15 season, the club obtained first place and was directly promoted. During the 2015–16 season, Sicula Leonzio achieved third place and then beat 3–1 (a.e.t.) Troina in the semifinal and 1–0 Acireale in the final of the promotion playoffs. As a result, the team qualified for the national playoffs for the promotion to Serie D, when they beat San Giorgio 1926 in the semi-final and Real Metapontino in the final.

Sicula Leonzio managed to keep a clean sheet for the first six league games of the 2016–17 Serie D (Girone I), receiving attention from the national Italian media as being the only team among the 264 professional football clubs in the first four tiers of Italian football league system having not conceded a goal up to that point. On November 22, 2016, Francesco Cozza was appointed as a new manager, replacing Seby Catania. Under the new management, Sicula Leonzio achieved a record 15 winning streak, and obtained the promotion – the third in a row – to the 2017–18 Serie C with three games to spare. This result meant a return to the third tier of Italian football after 23 years of absence for the club of Lentini. As a result, the club became a società a responsabilità limitata (S.r.l.), changing the name to Sicula Leonzio. After the Poule Scudetto, in which Leonzio lost to Monza in the semi-final, Cozza resigned his managerial position to become the manager of Taranto, being replaced by Pino Rigoli.

Serie C and dismissal (2017–2020)

After a difficult start in season 2017–18, in which Leonzio had won only three out of 16 matches, on December 5, 2017, Rigoli was replaced by Aimo Diana as manager of the club. With Diana as a manager, Sicula Leonzio achieved a final tenth place, which meant participating in the promotion playoffs that the club, however, lost against Cosenza Calcio.

For the new season, Leonzio appointed Paolo Bianco as a new manager starting in July 2018. However, Bianco resigned in December 2018, replaced by Vincenzo Torrente. Torrente leaves the managerial role at the end of the season, with the club finishing 13th in the league.

The 2019–20 season saw Vito Grieco appointed as manager, temporarily replaced by Giovanni Bucaro amid disappointing results. Although the team managed to avoid relegation by winning the playoffs against Bisceglie, the club was dismissed in August 2020 following the failure to register the team to the 2020–21 Serie C season because of judiciary issues faced by President Giuseppe Leonardi.

The short-lived F.C. Leonzio 1909 (2021)
In August 2021, a new club, named Associazione Sportiva Dilettantistica F.C. Leonzio 1909 and formed from the title of A.S.D. Siracusa, was admitted to Eccellenza. After two consecutive withdrawals, Leonzio was excluded from the league by the Lega Nazionale Dilettanti.

Another refoundation: S.S. Leonzio 1909 (2022–)
In the summer of 2022, the club was once again refounded under the denomination of Associazione Sportiva Dilettantistica S.S. Leonzio 1909 and the presidency of Gaetano Vinci. They have been admitted to 2022–23 Eccellenza.

Colours and badge 
Sicula Leonzio's colours were black and white.

Stadium 

Sicula Leonzio played their home matches at the Sicula Trasporti Stadium–Stadio Angelino Nobile, before July 2018 known as Stadio Angelino Nobile, which has a capacity of  3,500.

Honours

Sub-national titles
Serie C2
Promoted: 1992–93

Serie D
Promoted: 2016–17
Runners-up: 1972–73 (Girone I)

References

Further reading 
 

Leonzio
Leonzio
Leonzio
1909 establishments in Italy